Matías Raúl Rojo (born 19 April 1993) is an Argentine professional footballer who plays as a midfielder for Ciudad de Bolívar.

Career
Rojo started his career with Torneo Argentino A's Unión Sunchales, appearing in four fixtures throughout 2011–12 as they were relegated to Torneo Argentino B. He remained in the fourth tier for two years, netting eight goals across sixty-two matches which culminated with promotion in 2014. Having spent three further seasons in Torneo Federal A, netting two goals in each campaign, Rojo joined Primera B Nacional's Guillermo Brown on 13 August 2017. He made his professional bow during an away defeat to Instituto on 17 September. Six goals followed in 2017–18, including a brace over Ferro Carril Oeste in November, as they finished sixteenth.

Career statistics
.

References

External links

1993 births
Living people
Argentine footballers
Argentine expatriate footballers
People from Castellanos Department
Association football midfielders
Torneo Argentino A players
Torneo Argentino B players
Torneo Federal A players
Primera Nacional players
Unión de Sunchales footballers
Guillermo Brown footballers
Sportspeople from Santa Fe Province
Argentine expatriate sportspeople in Ecuador
Expatriate footballers in Ecuador